Scopula terminata is a moth of the family Geometridae. It is found in Afghanistan, Pakistan and China.

Subspecies
Scopula terminata terminata
Scopula terminata machadoi (Hausmann, 1993)

References

 , 1986: Data to the geometrid (Lepidoptera) fauna of Iran: Larentiinae and Sterrhinae. Annales historico-naturales Musei nationalis hungarici 78: 219-223. Full article: .
 , 1966: Österreichische entomologische Iran-Afghanistan-Expeditionen. Beiträge zur Lepidopterenfauna. Teil 9. Subfamilie Sterrhinae (Lepidoptera, Geometridae). Middle East Lepidoptera XXII. Zeitschrift der Wiener Entomologischen Geselschaft 51 (77): 113-138. Full article: .

Moths described in 1966
terminata
Moths of Asia